San Marino competed at the 1994 Winter Olympics in Lillehammer, Norway.

Alpine skiing

Men

Bobsleigh

References
Official Olympic Reports
 Olympic Winter Games 1994, full results by sports-reference.com

Nations at the 1994 Winter Olympics
1994 Winter Olympics
Winter Olympics